In mathematics, the notion of expansivity formalizes the notion of points moving away from one another under the action of an iterated function. The idea of expansivity is fairly rigid, as the definition of positive expansivity, below, as well as the Schwarz–Ahlfors–Pick theorem demonstrate.

Definition
If  is a metric space, a homeomorphism  is said to be expansive if there is a constant 

called the expansivity constant, such that for every pair of points  in  there is  an integer  such that 

Note that in this definition,  can be positive or negative, and so  may be expansive in the forward or backward directions.

If  

 

is a continuous map, we say that  is positively expansive (or forward expansive) if there is a 

 

Theorem of uniform expansivity

Discussion
Positive expansivity is much stronger than expansivity.
expansive homeomorphism, then  is finite (proof).

External links
Expansive dynamical systems on scholarpedia

Dynamical systems